Cirrhochrista griveaudalis is a moth in the family Crambidae. It was described by Viette in 1961. It is found on the Comoros.

References

Moths described in 1961
Spilomelinae
Moths of Africa